The Punggol LRT is an automated guideway transit line in Singapore. The line, which initially opened on 29 January 2005, connects the residential districts and suburbs of Punggol to Punggol Town Centre, where it connects with the North East MRT line and the Punggol Bus Interchange. It is the third line of the LRT system in Singapore and like all other LRT lines, it is fully elevated and uses automated trains.

The first phase is a  line with 15 stations in two loops. It is the second LRT line to be operated by SBS Transit.

History
Plans for the Punggol LRT line were drawn up and announced in January 1999 with the development of Punggol New Town. Construction began in June 2000 by a consortium comprising Sembcorp Industries, Mitsubishi Heavy Industries and Mitsubishi Corporation, at a cost of S$354 million. Meanwhile, the Punggol LRT line was awarded to Singapore Bus Service (present-day SBS Transit) on 20 May 1999. The first phase was completed in June 2004 and underwent testing by the Land Transport Authority. The system was handed over to SBS Transit on 1 December that year, which conducted more trial runs and staff training before the opening of the East Loop on 29 January 2005. However, due to limited developments around some stations on the loop at the time, only the stretch of stations from Cove station to Kadaloor station were opened. The West Loop opened in stages on 29 June 2014.

A covered middle track at Punggol station and two short track pieces branching from Teck Lee station had already been built in anticipation of a possible branch line to Punggol North, but these plans were subsequently cancelled, and a new Punggol Coast MRT station is being built instead.

Improvements
On 31 October 2012, the Land Transport Authority announced that by 2016 the Sengkang and Punggol LRT lines would be upgraded to two-car trains, doubling the passenger capacity. An additional 16 more cars were to be ordered, bringing the total fleet size to 57. The longer trains also required modifications to the signaling and communication system.

On 29 December 2016, trains started operating in the two-car formations on the line's East loop during morning and evening peak hours from 6.45 am to 8.45 am and from 6.15 pm to 8.15 pm. Service frequency will be maintained at three to four minutes during morning and evening peak hours.

On 15 December 2017, the Land Transport Authority said there will be limited services on parts of the Sengkang-Punggol LRT (SPLRT) on most Sundays from 14 January 2018 to 25 February that year, to facilitate renewal and improvement works from (except 18 February as it is a Chinese New Year holiday). Only one platform will open for service at 5.30am on Sundays. The other platform will open from 7am. On 22nd of that month, SBS Transit said the arrangement is expected to continue until end April that year.

From 27 May to 7 October that year, limited services on Sundays will continue on the Sengkang-Punggol LRT (SPLRT). One platform will open at 5.30am and the other platform will open at 5.30pm.

On 5 February 2021, the Land Transport Authority announced that it has purchased 17 two-car trains for the Punggol and Sengkang LRT systems. The new trains will be delivered progressively from 2024 to 2027. In addition to new trains, the Sengkang Depot will also be expanded to 11.1 ha from the existing 3.5 ha to ensure that is capacity and maintenance space for the new trains. The expansion of the depot will also see two new reception tracks being built to shorten the train launching time. To ensure there is enough electricity to support the larger fleet of trains, 3 new power stations will be built, increasing the total number of power stations supporting the system to 8 once completed.

Stations

Legend

List

Services
There are four services in total, with two on each loop. However, on the Electronic Display, they will not show the service letters.

Rolling stock

The Punggol LRT operates on the Mitsubishi Heavy Industries Crystal Mover rolling stock shared with the Sengkang LRT. An initial 41 trainsets entered service in 2003 under C810, with an additional 16 trainsets were delivered in 2016 under C810A, bearing only minor exterior differences from its predecessor. They are maintained and stabled at Sengkang Depot, with a service track between the Punggol and Sengkang LRT systems for the Punggol LRT trains to head to and from the depot.

The procurement of a further 34 vehicles (17 two-car trains) to boost the capacity of the Sengkang-Punggol LRT was announced by the Land Transport Authority in February 2021.

These trains, also known as automated people movers, are rubber-tyred for minimized operating noise within built-up areas and guided by two side rails and a power rail on either side. They operate in both single-car and double-car arrangements.

Train formation
The original system consists of single-car C810s. This boosted the capacity to 204 passengers per trip.

Train control
The line is equipped with Kyosan APM fixed block signalling system for Automatic train control (ATC) under Automatic train operation (ATO) GoA 4 (UTO). The subsystems consist of Automatic train protection (ATP) to govern train speed, Automatic Train Supervision (ATS) to track and schedule trains, and a computer-based interlocking (CBI) system that prevents incorrect signal and track points settings.

References

External links
 Punggol LRT line

Railway stations in Singapore opened in 2005
Light Rail Transit (Singapore) lines
Punggol
 
Crystal Mover people movers
Railway lines opened in 2005
Transport in North-East Region, Singapore
Automated guideway transit